The Order of Queen Tamara (თამარ მეფის ორდენი), a state award of Georgia, was established by the decision of the Parliament of Georgia № 1553 of July 31, 2009 to award only female representatives for outstanding services to the people and the homeland.

The Order of Queen Tamara is awarded with a cash prize of 4,000 lari.

Recipients
 Lamara Chkonia, soprano (2011)
 Eka Kvesitadze (2013)
 Maya Asathiani, Georgian TV presenter (2013)
 Nana Zhorzholiani, Georgian TV presenter and journalist (2013)
 Inga Grigolia (2013)
 Nino Shubladze (2013)
 Khatia Buniatishvili (2013)
 Kristijna Ojuland, Estonian statesman and politician, Minister of Foreign Affairs from 2002 to 2005 (2013)
 Irina Yenukidze, public figure (2015).

See also 

 Orders, decorations, and medals of Georgia
 Order of Queen Tamara (1918)

References 

Orders, decorations, and medals of Georgia (country)
Awards established in 2009
2009 establishments in Georgia (country)